Kirstie Elaine Alora (born November 25, 1989) is a Filipina taekwondo practitioner. She represented the Philippines at the 2016 Summer Olympics after winning the silver medal at the Asian Olympic Qualifying Tournament.

At the 2016 Summer Olympics, she was defeated by Maria Espinoza of Mexico in the round of 16. She was then defeated by Wiam Dislam of Morocco in the repechage. Alora was the flag bearer for the Philippines during the closing ceremony.

References

External links
 

Asian Games medalists in taekwondo
Taekwondo practitioners at the 2006 Asian Games
Taekwondo practitioners at the 2010 Asian Games
Taekwondo practitioners at the 2014 Asian Games
Filipino female taekwondo practitioners
1989 births
Asian Games bronze medalists for the Philippines
Living people
Taekwondo practitioners at the 2016 Summer Olympics
Olympic taekwondo practitioners of the Philippines
Medalists at the 2010 Asian Games
Medalists at the 2014 Asian Games
Southeast Asian Games silver medalists for the Philippines
Southeast Asian Games gold medalists for the Philippines
Southeast Asian Games competitors for the Philippines
Southeast Asian Games medalists in taekwondo
Taekwondo practitioners at the 2018 Asian Games
Competitors at the 2005 Southeast Asian Games
Competitors at the 2007 Southeast Asian Games
Competitors at the 2009 Southeast Asian Games
Competitors at the 2011 Southeast Asian Games
Competitors at the 2013 Southeast Asian Games
Competitors at the 2017 Southeast Asian Games
Competitors at the 2019 Southeast Asian Games
Asian Taekwondo Championships medalists
Competitors at the 2021 Southeast Asian Games